The Église Saint Roch, better known as  Église de Mazargues is a Roman Catholic parish church in Mazargues, 9th arrondissement, Marseille, France.

References

9th arrondissement of Marseille
Roman Catholic churches in Marseille
Roman Catholic churches completed in 1851
1851 establishments in France
19th-century Roman Catholic church buildings in France